The 1997 Slamboree was the fifth Slamboree professional wrestling pay-per-view (PPV) event produced by World Championship Wrestling (WCW). It took place on May 18, 1997 from the Independence Arena in Charlotte, North Carolina. As of 2014 the event is available on the WWE Network.

Storylines
The event featured professional wrestling matches that involve different wrestlers from pre-existing scripted feuds and storylines. Professional wrestlers portray villains, heroes, or less distinguishable characters in the scripted events that build tension and culminate in a wrestling match or series of matches.

Event

Prior to the pay-per-view there were two dark matches. During the first match, Yuji Nagata defeated Pat Tanaka. During the second match, The Public Enemy (Rocco Rock and Johnny Grunge) defeated Harlem Heat (Booker T and Stevie Ray).

During the open match of the pay-per-view, Lord Steven Regal defeated Ultimate Dragon to win the WCW World Television Championship. Sonny Onoo who came to the ring with Dragón, accidentally kicked Dragón giving Regal the opening to record the victory via submission with the Regal Stretch.

In the next match, Madusa defeated Luna Vachon, followed by Rey Misterio Jr. defeating Yuji Yasuraoka, and Glacier defeating Mortis via disqualification.

During the WCW United States Heavyweight Championship,  Dean Malenko successfully retained his title against Jeff Jarrett. During the match, Steve McMichael came to the ring and threw Jarrett back into the ring. This enabled Malenko to hit a powerbomb and ultimately picked up the victory via submission with the Texas Cloverleaf.

Meng then defeated Chris Benoit in a death match. Following this, The Steiner Brothers (Rick Steiner and Scott Steiner) defeated Konnan, and Hugh Morrus, followed by Steve McMichael defeating Reggie White.

During the main event, Ric Flair, Roddy Piper and Kevin Greene defeated nWo (Kevin Nash, Scott Hall and Syxx). Flair ultimately picked up the pinfall on Hall while in a figure-4 leglock, while Piper had Nash in a sleeper hold. This match marked Flair first match in 6 months.

Results

References

Professional wrestling in Charlotte, North Carolina
1997 in North Carolina
Events in Charlotte, North Carolina
1997
May 1997 events in the United States
1997 World Championship Wrestling pay-per-view events